Shangri-La Projects is a record label in Memphis, Tennessee that grew out of and split off from the Shangri-la Record store in Memphis, Tennessee, and released several of the seminal records of the early 1990s Memphis indie scene. It also
manufactured and distributed records for the Sugar Ditch label.

Label roster
611
Citizen's Utilities
Cornfed
Jim Dickinson (on Sugar Ditch)
The Everlasting Doug Easley Experience
For Her And The Snow
The Grifters
Hot Monkey
Ross Johnson (on Sugar Ditch)
The Kelley Deal 6000
Man With Gun Lives Here
The Memphis Goons
Othar Turner & His Rising Star Fife & Drum Band (on Sugar Ditch)
Will Roy Sanders
The Simple Ones
The Strapping Fieldhands

See also
 List of record labels

External links
 Official site

Record labels established in 1989
Companies based in Memphis, Tennessee
American independent record labels
Alternative rock record labels
Indie rock record labels